Gordon David McCallum Clyde (22 May 1933–26 January 2008) was a British television actor, writer and musician.

He was educated at Highgate School from 1945 and Christ's College, Cambridge from 1951, where he studied English and music. He is mainly known from the Dick Emery show.  At the start of each episode he appeared as the interviewer, interviewing various characters played by Emery, with responses such as "Ooh you are awful, but I like you". Clyde was also a regular presenter on the BBC children's programme Play School (UK TV series) during the late 1960s.

He also appeared with Morecambe and Wise, and wrote the music for Kisses on a Postcard.

Gordon was a very good pool player, often to be found in the private club "The 43" in Streatham where he would enjoy a pint in relative anonymity, as he was a very private man and a good friend. The club closed in around 1987/8 after suffering severe damage in the "Hurricane" of 87.

References

British male television actors
1933 births
2008 deaths
20th-century British male actors
People educated at Highgate School
Alumni of Christ's College, Cambridge
Place of birth missing